HD 26755, also known as HR 1313, is a spectroscopic binary located in the northern circumpolar constellation Camelopardalis, the giraffe. It has an apparent magnitude of 5.72, making it faintly visible to the naked eye under ideal conditions. At its current distance, HD 26755's brightness is diminished by 0.19 magnitudes due to interstellar dust.

The visible component is an evolved red giant with a stellar classification of K1 III. It is estimated to be 2.13 billion years old, enough time for the star to exhaust its core hydrogen and evolve to become a red giant. It has cooled and expanded to 9.4 times the Sun's radius. HD 26755 is a metal enriched star with an iron abundance 48% greater than the Sun.

References

K-type giants
Spectroscopic binaries
Camelopardalis (constellation)
BD+57 00787
026755
019983
1313
High-proper-motion stars